"Bandit" is a song by American rappers Juice Wrld and YoungBoy Never Broke Again, released as a single on October 4, 2019. It served as the final single released by Juice Wrld as a lead artist before his death suffering from a seizure at Chicago's Midway Airport on December 8, 2019, a few days after his 21st birthday. It was later added to Juice Wrld's second studio album Death Race for Love as a bonus track.

Written alongside producer Nick Mira, the song peaked at number ten on the US Billboard Hot 100, becoming NBA YoungBoy's highest charting single on the chart and Juice Wrld's second top ten single following "Lucid Dreams", which peaked at number two on the Hot 100 in 2018. The artwork, featuring a crossover of Juice Wrld and NBA YoungBoy's likeness beneath a bandana, was created by Max Cohen and Robert Gotham.

Lyrics
The song's lyrics feature Juice Wrld rapping about stealing a girl's heart, calling himself "the definition of a bandit".

Music video
The music video, released on October 4, 2019, was directed by Cole Bennett and features Juice Wrld on a bayou boat ride, during which he holds baby alligators, as well as YoungBoy performing wheelies on a quad bike. It was filmed in YoungBoy's hometown of Baton Rouge, Louisiana and at his residence in Gonzales, Louisiana.

Charts

Weekly charts

Year-end charts

Certifications

Release history

Notes

References

2019 singles
2019 songs
Interscope Records singles
Juice Wrld songs
Songs written by Juice Wrld
YoungBoy Never Broke Again songs
Songs written by Nick Mira
Songs written by YoungBoy Never Broke Again
Music videos directed by Cole Bennett